Su Mudaerji (ch: 苏木达尔基 tb: བསོད་ནམས་དར་རྒྱས།, born January 20, 1996), sometimes written as Sumudaerji is a Chinese mixed martial artist who competes in the Flyweight and Bantamweight divisions of the Ultimate Fighting Championship. As of January 24, 2023, he is #13 in the UFC flyweight rankings.

Mixed martial arts career

Early career

In his childhood, Sumudaerji used to herd cattle in the mountains. He was born with a passion for sports. When he was 14 years old, Sumudaerji joined the well-known Enbo Fight Club in China. He started practicing Sanda in 2010 and won the second place in the Sichuan Youth Sanda Championship. From 2014 to 2015, he was selected to study in the Sichuan Sanda team and then transitioned into MMA.
Starting his career in 2016, Mudaerji fought mostly for the Wu Lin Feng promotion, compiling an 11–3 record.

Ultimate Fighting Championship

Mudaerji made his UFC debut against Louis Smolka at UFC Fight Night 141 on November 24, 2018. He lost the fight via submission in round two.

Mudaerji next faced Andre Soukhamthath on August 31, 2019, on UFC Fight Night 157. He won the fight via unanimous decision.

Mudaerji faced Malcolm Gordon on November 28, 2020, at UFC on ESPN: Smith vs. Clark. He won the fight via knockout in round one. He earned a Performance of the Night bonus for the win.

Replacing Jeff Molina, Mudaerji faced Zarrukh Adashev on January 20, 2021, at UFC on ESPN 20. He won the fight via unanimous decision.

Mudaerji was scheduled to face Tim Elliott on June 26, 2021, at UFC Fight Night 190. However, Mudaerji pulled out due to a knee injury.

Mudaerji was scheduled to face Manel Kape on April 23, 2022, at UFC Fight Night 205. However, just three days before the event, Kape withdrew due to personal reasons and the bout was scrapped.

Mudaerji faced Matt Schnell on July 16, 2022, at UFC on ABC 3. Despite a triangle attempt in the first round, Mudaerji lost the bout via technical submission due to a triangle choke in the second round. This win earned both fighters the Fight of the Night bonus award.

Personal life
Mudaerji is the first UFC fighter of Tibetan ethnicity.

Championships and accomplishments

Mixed martial arts
Ultimate Fighting Championship
Performance of the Night (One time) 
Fight of the Night (One time)

Sanda
2010 Sichuan Junior Sanda Championship − 2nd place

Mixed martial arts record

|-
|Loss
|align=center|16–5
|Matt Schnell
|Technical Submission (triangle choke)
|UFC on ABC: Ortega vs. Rodríguez
|
|align=center|2
|align=center|4:24
|Elmont, New York, United States
|
|-
|Win
|align=center|16–4
|Zarrukh Adashev
|Decision (unanimous)
|UFC on ESPN: Chiesa vs. Magny
|
|align=center|3
|align=center|5:00
|Abu Dhabi, United Arab Emirates
|
|-
|Win
|align=center|15–4
|Malcolm Gordon
|KO (punches)
|UFC on ESPN: Smith vs. Clark
|
|align=center|1
|align=center|0:44
|Las Vegas, Nevada, United States
|
|-
|Win
|align=center|14–4
|Andre Soukhamthath
|Decision (unanimous)
|UFC Fight Night: Andrade vs. Zhang 
|
|align=center|3
|align=center|5:00
|Shenzhen, China
|
|-
|Loss
|align=center|13–4
|Louis Smolka
|Submission (armbar)
|UFC Fight Night: Blaydes vs. Ngannou 2
|
|align=center|2
|align=center|2:07
|Beijing, China
|
|-
|Loss
|align=center|13–3
|Hao Bin Ma
|Technical Submission (rear-naked choke)
|WLF: W.A.R.S. 28
|
|align=center|2 
|align=center|3:57
|Zhengzhou, China
|
|-
|Win
|align=center|13–2
|Yusei Saiton
|KO (punches)
|ABA Fighting Championship: Hongyuan
|
|align=center|1
|align=center|0:53
|Hongyuan County, China
|
|-
|Win
|align=center|12–2
|Temirulan Bamadaliev
|TKO (punches)
|WLF: W.A.R.S. 25
|
|align=center|1
|align=center|2:14
|Zhengzhou, China
|
|-
| Win
| align=center| 11–2
| Zelimkhan Makaev
| KO (spinning back kick)
| WLF: W.A.R.S. 23
| 
| align=center| 1
| align=center| 4:01
| Zhengzhou, China
|
|-
| Win
| align=center|10–2
| Bidzina Gavashelishvili
| KO (flying knee)
| WLF: W.A.R.S. 22
| 
| align=center|1
| align=center|2:36
| Kaifeng, China
|
|-
| Loss
| align=center|9–2
| Abdulla Aliev
| Submission (rear-naked choke)
| WLF: W.A.R.S. 21
| 
| align=center|3
| align=center|3:16
| Zhengzhou, China
|
|-
| Win
| align=center|9–1
| Kirill
| KO (punch to the body)
| IPFC: YunFeng Showdown 7
| 
| align=center|1
| align=center|3:19
| Laizhou, China
|
|-
| Win
| align=center|8–1
| Ryota Kobayashi
| TKO (punches)
| WLF: W.A.R.S. 18
| 
| align=center|1
| align=center|1:19
| Maerkang, China
|
|-
| Win
| align=center|7–1
| Jomar Manlangit
| KO (punch to the body)
| WLF: W.A.R.S. 17
| 
| align=center|2
| align=center|1:20
| Zhengzhou, China
|
|-
| Win
| align=center| 6–1
| Pengshuai Liu
| KO (punches)
| Chin Woo Men: 2016-2017 Season, Stage 6
| 
| align=center|1
| align=center|4:28
| Guangzhou, China
|
|-
| Win
| align=center| 5–1
| Junye Gao
| KO (punches)
| WLF World Championship
|
|align=Center|1
|align=center|3:38
|Zhengzhou, China
| 
|-
| Win
| align=center| 4–1
| Teimur Ragimov
| Submission (rear-naked choke)
| WLF: E.P.I.C. 8
| 
| align=center| 3
| align=center| 1:15
| Zhengzhou, China
| 
|-
| Win
| align=center| 3–1
| Isaias Celiva
| TKO (doctor stoppage)
| WLF: E.P.I.C. 5
| 
| align=center| 2
| align=center| 5:00
| Zhengzhou, China
| 
|-
| Win
| align=center| 2–1
| Leonid Malozemov
| KO (head kick)
| WLF: E.P.I.C. 3
| 
| align=center| 2
| align=center| 0:06
| Zhengzhou, China
| 
|-
| Loss
| align=center| 1–1
| Yusuke Uehara
| Submission (straight armbar)
| WLF: E.P.I.C. 2
| 
| align=center| 1
| align=center|2:41
| Zhengzhou, China
|
|-
| Win
| align=center| 1–0
| Seung Heon Lim
| TKO (doctor stoppage)
| WLF: E.P.I.C. 1
| 
| align=center| 1
| align=center| 2:44
| Zhengzhou, China
|

See also 
 List of current UFC fighters
 List of male mixed martial artists

References

External links 
  
 

1996 births
Living people
Chinese male mixed martial artists
Flyweight mixed martial artists
Ultimate Fighting Championship male fighters
People of Tibetan descent
Chinese sanshou practitioners
Tibetan sportspeople
Athletes from Sichuan
People from Ngawa
Mixed martial artists utilizing sanshou